Biševo (Chakavian: Bisovo) is an island in the Adriatic Sea in Croatia. It is situated in the middle of the Dalmatian archipelago, five kilometers southwest of the Island of Vis.

Geography
Biševo is composed of limestone. In the center of the island there is a fertile field, the northern part of the island is covered with pine forests and the rest of the island is covered with maquis shrubland or bare rocks. The coastal sea belt is a rich fishing area. The main industries are viticulture and fishing.

History
A Benedictine monastery was founded on Biševo in 1050 by Ivan Grlić from Split, but it was deserted two centuries later because of the danger of pirates. The church of Saint Sylvester is preserved near the ruins of the monastery.

There was a school on the island, built in 1947 and closed in 1961. Electricity was introduced in the 1970s.

Blue Cave

On the steep shores there are many caves, the most famous being Blue Cave, which was carved in the limestone by the sea. It is located on the eastern side of the island and is one of the most important attractions of the Adriatic. It was well-known to local fishermen, who in 1884 showed it to the Austrian artist, explorer, and speleologist , who published an article in the Viennese daily Neue Freie Presse declaring that its beauty surpassed even that of Capri's famed Blue Grotto. From that time on, it became a major tourist attraction.

The approach to the cave is only possible by boat. During the summer between 10 am and 1 pm, sunbeams penetrate through the submarine opening in Blue Cave and are reflected from the white bottom floor, coloring the cave blue and objects in the water silver.

Monk Seal Cave

The cave is located on the southeast side of the island Biševo and it has been protected since 1967. The name of the cave originates from the fact that the Mediterranean monk seal massively populated it, today it's an endangered species. It's special geomorphologically because the entrance into the Monk Seal Cave is quite big and wide, it narrows completely towards the interior. The length of the cave is 160m and it ends with a small shore that only small ships as speedboats can reach. This cave is difficult to spot when cruising away from the shore, due to the unusually narrow, almost vertical, thirty meters high opening in the stone gorge.

Medvidina (Monk Seal) cave is located in the southeastern part of the island, near Cape Biskup. The interior of the cave consists of a main, spacious hall and a low winding canal which, after about seventy meters, ends with a small beach.

The Monk Seal Cave is also an famous Dalmatian islands tourist attraction.

See also
 Croatia
 Vis (island)
 Dalmatia

References

Bibliography

External links

 The initiative “Saving the island of Bisevo”
 Petition "Saving the island of Bisevo from uncontrolled development"
 Biševo Island Artist Residency Program
 Biševo on croatia-beaches.com
 Biševo on croatiatouristcenter.com
  Article about Biševo

Islands of Croatia
Islands of the Adriatic Sea
Landforms of Split-Dalmatia County